Events from the year 1841 in Sweden

Incumbents
 Monarch – Charles XIV John

Events
 10 June - The Stocks punishment, already restricted and generally fallen of use, is banned.
 6 August - Swedish Road Administration is founded.
 The state supported brothels London and Stadt Hamburg is closed. 
 Wendela Hebbe, regarded a pioneer of female reporters, is employed as a reporter at Aftonbladet.
 First issue of the Barometern.
 Foundation of the shipping company Götaverken.
 The first issue of the Sundsvalls Tidning.
 The first of the von Schwerin Estate's Scandals attracts attention. 
 Blommorna vid vägen, by Herman Sätherberg
 Diodes och Lydia by Wilhelmina Stålberg
 Kyrkoinvigningen i Hammarby by Emilie Flygare-Carlén
  by Anna Carlström
 Qvinnan utan förmyndare (Woman without Guardian) by Amelie von Strussenfelt
 Inauguration of the Carolina Rediviva

Births
 27 January – Selma Jacobsson, photographer (died 1899) 
 19 February – Elfrida Andrée, first female organist   (died 1929) 
 18 June - Hedvig Willman, actress (died 1887) 
 24 August – Anna Hierta-Retzius, women's right activist (died 1924)
 8 September - Carl Snoilsky, poet  (died 1903) 
 29 December - Rosalie Fougelberg, dentist (died 1911)

Deaths
 12 January – Märta Helena Reenstierna, diarist  (born 1753)
 19 February – Ulrika Carolina Widström, poet   (born 1764)
 17 September - Erik Djurström, stage actor (born 1787)
 28 October - Johann Arfvedson,  chemist who discovered the chemical element lithium  (born 1792)
  – Mariana Koskull, royal mistress  (born 1785)
  - Christina Fredenheim, singer  (born 1762)

References

 
Years of the 19th century in Sweden
Sweden